Edward Kramer Emerson (March 11, 1892 – January 27, 1970) was a star football player in  the Canadian Football League for twenty-two seasons for the Ottawa Rough Riders. Fondly known as the "Iron Man" of football, Emerson led his team to two Grey Cup wins, in 1925 and 1926. After retiring from the field, Emerson stayed with the Rough Riders as president of the football club from 1947–1951.

He was inducted into the Canadian Football Hall of Fame in 1963 and into the Canada's Sports Hall of Fame in 1975.

External Reference
 Canada's Sports Hall of Fame profile
    

1892 births
1970 deaths
American players of Canadian football
Ottawa Rough Riders players
Canadian Football Hall of Fame inductees